Challengers Cup is a South Korean football competition operated by the Korea Football Association. It is played on a knockout (single elimination) basis and only Challengers League's clubs can enter the competition.

The competition was inaugurated in the 2011 season. First competition was held from 5 August 2011 to 13 August 2011.

References